Artyom Ignatenko (born 1 March 1990) is a Kazakhstani professional ice hockey player currently playing for Arystan Temirtau in the Kazakhstan Hockey Championship league.

References

External links

Kazakhstani ice hockey forwards
Arystan Temirtau players
1990 births
Living people
Sportspeople from Astana
Universiade medalists in ice hockey
Universiade silver medalists for Kazakhstan
Competitors at the 2011 Winter Universiade
Competitors at the 2013 Winter Universiade